Akihiko Koike (born April 10, 1973) is a retired male race walker from Nagano, Japan. He set his personal best (1:20.16) in the men's 20 km on January 30, 2000, in Kobe. He made two major global appearances: first at the 1999 World Championships in Athletics, where he was 27th in the men's 50 km walk, and secondly at the 2000 Sydney Olympics, where he failed to finish the 20 km race.

Achievements

References

sports-reference

1973 births
Living people
Athletes (track and field) at the 2000 Summer Olympics
Japanese male racewalkers
Olympic athletes of Japan
People from Nagano Prefecture
20th-century Japanese people
21st-century Japanese people